Westwood Regional High School (formerly Westwood Regional Jr./Sr. High School) is a four-year comprehensive regional public high school that serves students in ninth through twelfth grades from Borough of Westwood and the Township of Washington, in Bergen County, New Jersey, United States, operating as the lone secondary school of the Westwood Regional School District. Beginning in the 2019–20 school year, students in eighth grade who had previously attended the then junior-senior high school began attending the new Westwood Middle School.

As of the 2021–22 school year, the school had an enrollment of 845 students and 84.4 classroom teachers (on an FTE basis), for a student–teacher ratio of 10.0:1. There were 58 students (6.9% of enrollment) eligible for free lunch and 32 (3.8% of students) eligible for reduced-cost lunch.

Awards and recognition
The school was the 106th-ranked public high school in New Jersey out of 339 schools statewide in New Jersey Monthly magazine's September 2014 cover story on the state's "Top Public High Schools", using a new ranking methodology. The school had been ranked 58th in the state of 328 schools in 2012, after being ranked 92nd in 2010 out of 322 schools listed. The magazine ranked the school 56th in 2008 out of 316 schools. The school was ranked 81st in the magazine's September 2006 issue, which included 316 schools across the state. Schooldigger.com ranked the school tied for 128th out of 381 public high schools statewide in its 2011 rankings (a decrease of 9 positions from the 2010 ranking) which were based on the combined percentage of students classified as proficient or above proficient on the mathematics (83.8%) and language arts literacy (95.9%) components of the High School Proficiency Assessment (HSPA).

Curriculum
Advanced Placement (AP) courses offered include AP Art History, AP Biology, AP Calculus AB, AP Calculus BC, AP Chemistry, AP Computer Science, AP English Literature and Composition, AP French Language, AP Microeconomics, AP Physics B, AP Psychology, AP Environmental Science,AP Spanish Language, AP Statistics, AP Studio Art, AP United States History, AP United States Government and Politics, AP World History.

Extracurricular activities
There is a wide range of activities and clubs for students to participate in:
Academic Decathlon
Anime Club
American Sign Language Club
Math Team
Gay-Straight Alliance (GSA)
Interact Club
Marine Fitness
Students Against Destructive Decisions (SADD)
Ski Club
Web Design Club
Yearbook
Varsity Club
Student Council
Newspaper
Ecology Club
Students for an Active Voice (SAV)
Los Picaros (Spanish Club)
Jazz Band
Pit Band
Film Club
Peer Pals
Heroes & Cool Kids
Select Choir
Woodington Players (Dramatics Club)
Marching Band
Color Guard
WIN (Westwood Investment Network)
Poetry SLAM Club
National Art Honor Society
National Honor Society
Spanish National Honor Society
French National Honor Society
Debate Team
Art Club
Senior Prom Committee
BrainBusters
Future Business Leaders of America

Athletics
The Westwood Regional High School Cardinals compete in the Big North Conference, which is comprised of public and private high schools in Bergen and Passaic counties, and was established following a reorganization of sports leagues in Northern New Jersey by the New Jersey State Interscholastic Athletic Association (NJSIAA). Before the NJSIAA's 2009 realignment, the school had previously participated in the Bergen County Scholastic League (BCSL) American Conference, which included public and private high schools located in Bergen and Hudson counties. With 628 students in grades 10–12, the school was classified by the NJSIAA for the 2019–20 school year as Group II for most athletic competition purposes, which included schools with an enrollment of 486 to 758 students in that grade range. The football team competes in the American Red division of the North Jersey Super Football Conference, which includes 112 schools competing in 20 divisions, making it the nation's biggest football-only high school sports league. The school was classified by the NJSIAA as Group II North for football for 2022–2024. Westwood Regional High School athletic teams are called the Cardinals. They wear school colors scarlet, white and black. The school's original colors were scarlet and white, with black added later as an official school color.

The school participates in joint cooperative boys / girls swimming teams with River Dell Regional High School as the host school / lead agency. River Dell also hosts a co-op ice hockey team that includes Emerson Jr./Sr. High School and Westwood. These co-op programs operate under agreements scheduled to expire at the end of the 2023–24 school year.

Sports offered by the school include:

Fall sports: cross country (boys and girls), field hockey, football, soccer (boys and girls), tennis (girls), volleyball (girls)
Winter sports: basketball (boys and girls), bowling (boys and girls), indoor track (boys and girls), wrestling
Spring sports: baseball, golf, lacrosse (boys and girls), outdoor track (boys and girls), softball, tennis (boys and girls)

The boys' basketball team finished the 1951 season with a 21–1 record after winning the Group II state championship with a 68–48 victory against runner-up Ocean City High School in the tournament final.

The boys cross country team won the Group II state title in 1963.

The softball team won the North I state sectional championship in 1974 and 1975.

The field hockey team won the North I Group II state sectional title in 1987 and won the Group II state title that year as co-champion after a 1–1 tie in the finals against Moorestown High School to finish the season with a record of 18-2-1.

The girls volleyball team won the Group II state championship in 1989 (defeating runner-up Lyndhurst High School in the final match of the playoffs) and 1997 (vs. New Milford High School).

The boys track team won the indoor relay championship in Group I in 1998

The football team won the NJSIAA North I Group II state sectional championship in 2000, 2006, 2013 and 2014, and won the North I Group I title in 2004. The 2000 team won the North II Group I state sectional title with a 33–7 win against Pompton Lakes High School in the championship final played at Kean University. The 2006 team went to Giants Stadium in East Rutherford where they played the Indians of Pascack Valley High School in the North I Group II finals, beating them 9–8. The school has had a football rivalry since 1976 with River Dell Regional High School called the "Bird Bowl", in which the winner receives a trophy with a football inside of a bird cage. Westwood leads the series with an overall record of 20-18 through the 2017 season. NJ.com listed the rivalry as 28th on its 2017 list "Ranking the 31 fiercest rivalries in N.J. HS football".

The boys' spring track team won three consecutive Bergen County Tournament championships from 2004 to 2006. In Spring 2005 the team went undefeated in Bergen County, and won the North I Group II state championship by a record margin.

In 2007, the boys' basketball team played in the North I, Group II state championship, falling to Pascack Hills High School by 66–65 in overtime, in a game played at River Dell High School.

The girls spring track team was the Group I co-champion in 2010.

Administration
The school's principal is Frank Connelly. His administration team includes three assistant principals.

Notable alumni

 Reuven Ben-Yosef (1937–2001), poet and author.
 Doug Henwood (born 1952), journalist and publisher of the Left Business Observer.
 Raymond E. Johns Jr. (born 1955), General, Commander Air Mobility Command, United States Air Force.
 James O'Keefe (born 1984), activist-filmmaker who targeted ACORN.
 B. J. Raji (born 1986), the ninth overall pick in 2009 NFL Draft by the Green Bay Packers.
 Corey Raji (born 1988), professional basketball player.
 Elizabeth Randall (born 1954, class of 1971), politician who served in the New Jersey General Assembly from 1986 to 1992, representing the 39th Legislative District.
 Kevin Sampson (born 1981), tackle for the Kansas City Chiefs.
 Kyle Scatliffe (born 1986), stage actor best known for playing Enjolras in the 2014 Broadway revival of Les Misérables, and Harpo in the 2015 Broadway Revival of The Color Purple.
 Bob Schroeder (born 1960), businessman and politician who served in the New Jersey General Assembly from 2010 to 2014, where he represented the 39th Legislative District.

References

External links
Westwood Regional High School
Westwood Regional School District

School Data for the Westwood Regional School District, National Center for Education Statistics

Washington Township, Bergen County, New Jersey
Westwood, New Jersey
1967 establishments in New Jersey
Educational institutions established in 1967
Public high schools in Bergen County, New Jersey